The NAM News Network (NNN) is a news agency established by countries of the Non-Aligned Movement to disseminate news which is not prejudicial to the third-world countries.

Organisation and operations
It was established at the initiative of Malaysia, but in concurrence with the decision taken by the Sixth Conference of Ministers of Information of Non-Aligned Countries (COMINAC VI) hosted in Kuala Lumpur, Malaysia in November 2005. The agency was created after the earlier network, Non-Aligned News Agencies Pool (NANAP), became defunct.

According to the agency's website, "the NNN sees itself as an alternative source of information rather than being in competition with other major news services. Essentially it would serve as a conduit for NAM member countries to tell their story and use it as a yet another tool of communication for them".

Secretariat
The agency's secretariat is located in Kuala Lumpur, Malaysia.

See also

 List of news agencies

References

External links
 namnewsnetwork.org, the official website of the NAM News Network

2005 establishments in Malaysia
Multilingual news services
Non-Aligned Movement
Organizations established in 2005
News agencies based in Malaysia